Dong-chan is a Korean male given name.

People with this name include:
Kim Dong-chan (born 1981), South Korean footballer
Cho Dong-chan (born 1983), South Korean baseball player

Fictional characters with this name include:
Ki Dong-chan, in 2014 South Korean television series God's Gift - 14 Days

See also
List of Korean given names

Korean masculine given names